Minnesota State Highway 228 (MN 228) was a  highway in west-central Minnesota, which ran from its intersection with Otter Tail County Roads 4 and 17 in Vergas and continued east to its eastern terminus at its intersection with U.S. Highway 10 in the unincorporated town of Luce in Gorman Township.

MN 228 passed through the communities of Vergas, Hobart Township, and Gorman Township.

Route description
Highway 228 served as an east–west connector route in west-central Minnesota between U.S. Highway 10 at Gorman Township and the town of Vergas.

Highway 228 was also known as Main Street and Frazee Avenue in Vergas.

The route passed around the west side of Long Lake in Vergas.

The route was legally defined as Route 227 in the Minnesota Statutes.

History
Highway 228 was authorized on July 1, 1949. The route was paved in 1954 or 1955. Highway 228 has been decommissioned  66 years later on July 1, 2015, by MnDOT and has been turned over to Otter Tail County as an extension of Otter Tail County Roads 4 and 60.

Major intersections

References

External links

Highway 228 at the Unofficial Minnesota Highways Page

228